Li Hao may refer to:

Li Hao (murderer), murderer and rapist sentenced to death in 2014
Li Gao or Li Hao (351–417), Northern Liang official who founded the Western Liang
Li Hao (Later Shu) (died 965), official of the Former Shu, Later Tang, and Later Shu
Li Hao (footballer, born 1992), Chinese footballer
Li Hao (footballer, born 2004), Chinese footballer
Li Hao (fencer) (born 1994), Chinese wheelchair fencer
Hao Li (born 1981), computer scientist, innovator, and entrepreneur